Cedar Hills Crossing, formerly Beaverton Mall, is a retail shopping center in the city of Beaverton, Oregon, United States. The center is notable in that it was the prior site of a historic airport, Bernard's Airport, where many of the early aircraft innovations of the 1920s and 1930s occurred. Cedar Hills Crossing has been in operation since 1969, and is located approximately between the intersection of SW Cedar Hills Boulevard and Walker Road and the intersection of SW Cedar Hills Boulevard and Hall Boulevard. The current name was adopted in September 2002 when C.E. John Company began the redevelopment of the Mall.

History
Prior to the mall's construction, the site was a small airport known as Bernard's Airport. An underground chemical release at the site was discovered in the 1980s. Considerable analysis of this release, along with other on site environmental factors, has been conducted to provide for safety of mall patrons and area residents. At least through the period 1970 to 1990 (the interval when the release occurred) the center functioned in compliance with most local governmental standards for environmental regulation.

The mall's name was changed to Cedar Hills Crossing in the last stages of renovations and expansion that began in September 2002. The interior mall shops and restaurants located between Powell's and Golf Galaxy was named The Barking Frog. In 2003, tenants and operators of the mall were successful in removing from the city's local street master plan a proposed Fairfield Street–Terman Road connection that would have cut through the shopping center's site.

A new 16-screen movie theatre was opened by Century Theatres in November 2004, and a food court was added at around the same time. Since 2006, the shopping center has included a branch of Powell's Books.

See also
List of shopping malls in Oregon

References

External links

City of Beaverton Historical Photos, aerial photography of the mall and airport

Buildings and structures in Beaverton, Oregon
Shopping malls in Washington County, Oregon
Shopping malls established in 1969
1969 establishments in Oregon